This is a list of settlements on the Creuddyn peninsula in North Wales.

 

B
Bryn Pydew

D
Deganwy

E
Esgyryn

G
Glanwydden
Gogarth

L
Llandudno
Llandudno Junction
Llangystennin
Llanrhos

P
Pabo
Penrhyn Bay
Penrhynside

R
Rhos-on-Sea

Creuddyn